Ian Carlo Poveda-Ocampo (born 9 February 2000), sometimes known as Ian Carlo Poveda or Ian Poveda-Ocampo, is an English professional footballer who plays as an attacking midfielder or a winger  for Championship club Blackpool on loan from Premier League club Leeds United, and, internationally, England national U20 team.

He is a product of the Manchester City, Barcelona and Brentford youth systems and has been capped by England at youth level.

Club career
Poveda started his career in the academy at Chelsea, where he was part of the same age group as Rhian Brewster and Reece James, before being poached by Arsenal and then Barcelona. Poveda was reported to have had a brief spell with Malaga-based side Puerto Malagueno between his stints at Arsenal and Barcelona, but did not play for, or officially register, with them.

Brentford
Poveda joined the academy at Brentford during the 2014 off-season, having left Barcelona due to the club being prosecuted for signing minors illegally. He was a member of the U15 squad which finished as runners-up in the Junior Vase at the 2015 Milk Cup and progressed to make 15 appearances and score three goals for the youth team during the 2015–16 season, which also included three appearances for the Development Squad. Poveda departed Brentford in July 2016, due to the closure of the club's academy.

Manchester City
On 18 July 2016, Poveda joined the academy at Premier League club Manchester City for an undisclosed fee and commenced a two-year scholarship. He was a member of the U18 team which finished as runners-up to Chelsea in the 2016–17 FA Youth Cup. Poveda took part in Manchester City's First Team's pre-season tour of the United States in the summer of 2018. After five EFL Trophy appearances and two goals for the U21 team during the first half of the 2018–19 season, Poveda made his senior debut for the club with a start in a 1–0 EFL Cup semi-final second leg win over Burton Albion on 23 January 2019.

Poveda was named on the bench for Manchester City in their 3–1 EFL Cup victory over Southampton in October 2019, with Pep Guardiola personally apologising for not bringing Poveda on after the game, with the midfielder set to come on before a goal from Southampton changed his in-game substitution. In November 2019, Poveda was called up to the Manchester City squad for their Champions League fixture against Atalanta.

In January 2020, Poveda held talks with Serie A club Torino and Championship side Leeds United, with contact also from Bundesliga side TSG Hoffenheim ahead of a possible move in the January window.

Leeds United
On 24 January 2020, Poveda signed for Leeds United on a four-and-a-half year contract until the end of the 2023–24 season for an undisclosed fee and was assigned the number 7 shirt, with Poveda stating he was very excited to work under his new manager Marcelo Bielsa. He made his Leeds debut on 21 June 2020 as a second-half substitute in a 2–0 Championship defeat at Cardiff City.

After the English professional football season was paused in March 2020 due to the impact of the COVID-19 pandemic on association football, the season was resumed during June, where Poveda earned promotion with Leeds to the Premier League and also become the EFL Championship Champions for the 2019–20 season in July after the successful resumption of the season.

His first start of the 2020–21 season came on 16 September 2020 for Premier League Leeds in a 1–1 draw against Hull City in the EFL Cup. He made his Premier League debut in a 1-0 away win over Sheffield United on 27 September 2020. Poveda featured sixteen times for Leeds throughout the 20/21 season.

Loan to Blackburn Rovers

On 23 August 2021, Poveda joined Championship club Blackburn Rovers on a season-long loan. Poveda scored his first senior goal of his career on 6 November, netting the equaliser in an eventual 3–1 home win over Sheffield United.

On 20 November, Poveda was taken off in the 44th minute of Blackburn’s 1-1 draw with Bristol City after sustaining an injury to his left ankle. Blackburn later confirmed that following a scan, Poveda suffered both a fracture and ligament damage in his left ankle which will likely see the player ruled out for a significant amount of time.

Loan to Blackpool 
On 27 August 2022, Poveda joined Championship side Blackpool F.C. on a season-long loan. On March 16, Poveda scored his first goal for Blackpool in new manager Mick McCarthy's first win as manager.

International career
Poveda is eligible to play for England and Colombia at international level. He won his maiden call into the England U16 squad in August 2015, while still 15 years old. He was a member of the 2015 Nike International Tournament-winning squad. He was a member of the U17 squad which won the 2016 Croatia Cup. In March 2018, Poveda received his first international call-up for 18 months, for U18 friendlies versus Qatar, Belarus and a mixed-age Argentina team. He appeared in each match and scored three goals. He also graduated to the U19 team in 2018.

On 4 October 2019, Poveda was included in the England U20 squad for the first time  and made his debut as a 72nd-minute substitute during a 2–2 draw away to Italy in the U20 Elite League.

Personal life
Poveda was born in London, England, to Colombian parents. During his youth years, Poveda also played youth tournaments for Southwark schoolboys alongside Jadon Sancho and Reiss Nelson who also became professional footballers.

Style of play
Poveda plays predominantly as a winger or a forward, Poveda is capable of playing on both flanks or through the middle as an attacking midfielder or as a false 9. Manchester City's website described his style as 'Nimble and fleet-footed', with the Manchester Evening News describing him as having 'trickery and an eye for goal'.

Poveda describes himself as 'an attacking player, I can play right wing, left wing or in attacking midfield, I like to dribble with the ball, link up the play, score goals, create chances, assist and I work hard for the team'.

Poveda said in December 2019 that Raheem Sterling was a big brother figure to him at Manchester City helping him with positioning and advice in training.

Career statistics

Honours

Club
Leeds United
EFL Championship: 2019–20

International
England U16
 Nike International Tournament: 2015

England U17
 Croatia Cup: 2016

References

External links
 
 Ian Carlo Poveda at the Manchester City F.C. website
 Ian Carlo Poveda at TheFA.com
 

2000 births
Living people
English footballers
England youth international footballers
English expatriate footballers
Association football forwards
Chelsea F.C. players
Arsenal F.C. players
FC Barcelona players
Brentford F.C. players
Manchester City F.C. players
Leeds United F.C. players
Blackburn Rovers F.C. players
Blackpool F.C. players
English people of Colombian descent
Footballers from Southwark
English expatriate sportspeople in Spain
Expatriate footballers in Spain
Premier League players
English Football League players